is a railway station in Itoigawa, Niigata, Japan, operated by Echigo Tokimeki Railway.

Lines

Station layout
The station consists of one island platform connected to the station building by a level crossing. The station is unattended.

Platforms

Adjacent stations

History
The station opened on 16 December 1912, as part of the Japanese Government Railways (JGR, JNR after 1949). From this date, Oyashirazu Station was transferred to the ownership of the third-sector operating company Echigo Tokimeki Railway.

Passenger statistics
In fiscal 2015, the station was used by an average of 18 passengers daily (boarding passengers only).

Surrounding area
Oyashirazu Post Office
Oyashirazu Swimming Beach

See also
 List of railway stations in Japan

References

External links

Train timetables 

Railway stations in Niigata Prefecture
Railway stations in Japan opened in 1912
Stations of Echigo Tokimeki Railway
Itoigawa, Niigata